Tom Holloway is an Australian playwright, based in Melbourne  .

Holloway's plays have been performed across Australia and internationally, including Beyond the Neck at Belvoir St Theatre (2007), Red Sky Morning at Red Stitch Actors Theatre (2008-9) and regional tour, and Don't Say The Words (2009).  And No More Shall We Part (2011) was performed by Griffin Theatre Company, Sydney and London's Hampstead Theatre (2012). His stage adaptation of Colin Thiele's Storm Boy premiered in Sydney in 2013.

In February 2011, his play Fatherland received its debut at the Gate Theatre in London.

Education

After attending University in Tasmania, Holloway studied playwriting at Sydney's National Institute of Dramatic Art in 2001, as well as at London's Royal Court Theatre International Playwriting Studio in 2006.

Plays

Style

Holloway has likened aspects of his work to postdramatic theatre. On Love Me Tender, he said: "There's been a big push away from story the last ten years in this movement called ‘post-dramatic theatre'. They're very fragmented and experimental, these plays...  I'm taking what I love about those plays and feeding narrative back into it.".

Awards

Beyond the Neck received a 2008 AWGIE Award for Best Stage Play.

Red Sky Morning was awarded an R. E. Ross Trust Script Award and a Green Room Award for Best New Play.

In 2010, And No More Shall We Part received the Victorian Premier's Literary Awards Louis Esson Prize for Drama. and the 2010 AWGIE Award for Best Stage Play.

In 2011 his play Faces Look Ugly won the Max Afford Award.

He was shortlisted for the 2011 AWGIE, the 2009 NSW Premier's Literary Award, the 2011 WA Premier's Literary Award and the 2008 and 2009 Patrick White Awards.

References

External links

Australian male dramatists and playwrights
Place of birth missing (living people)
Year of birth missing (living people)
Living people
21st-century Australian dramatists and playwrights
21st-century Australian male writers
National Institute of Dramatic Art alumni